Eye in the Sky is the sixth studio album by British rock band the Alan Parsons Project, released in May 1982 by Arista Records. At the 25th Annual Grammy Awards in 1983, Eye in the Sky was nominated for the Grammy Award for Best Engineered Album. In 2019, the album won the Grammy Award for Best Immersive Audio Album at the 61st Annual Grammy Awards.

Production
Eye in the Sky is the first of three albums the Project recorded on analogue equipment and mixed directly to the digital master tape.

Release
Eye in the Sky was the last platinum record in the United States from the band.

Eye in the Sky contains the title track, the Project's biggest hit, with lead vocals by Eric Woolfson. The album itself was a major success, reaching the top 10 (and sometimes the number one slot) in numerous countries.

The album features the instrumental piece "Sirius", which has become a staple of many college and professional sporting arenas throughout North America. It is best known for its use by the Chicago Bulls to introduce its starting line-up during its championship years of the 1990s and is still used today.

Another instrumental, "Mammagamma", was used separately by TVNZ in New Zealand and BBC Wales in the mid-1980s for their snooker coverage, and as a bed for the "My Favourite Five" feature on Tony Fenton's late-night 2FM show across 1989 and 1990.

On 1 December 2017, a 35th-anniversary-edition box set of the album was released, for which Alan Parsons, along with surround mastering engineers Dave Donnelly and PJ Olsson, won the Grammy Award for Best Immersive Audio Album at the 61st Annual Grammy Awards.

Reception

From contemporary reviews, Ken Tucker of The Philadelphia Inquirer gave the album a one star rating out of five rating, calling it a "hopelessly banal album" with "Paul McCartney-as-manic-depressive melodies and whining vocals would be merely pathetic were it not for Parsons' lyric pretensions".

From retrospective reviews, Stephen Thomas Erlewine of AllMusic gave the album a four and a half star rating, stating that "this is a soft rock album through and through, one that's about melodic hooks and texture," noting that "with the exception of those instrumentals and the galloping suite "Silence and I," all the artiness was part of the idea of this album was pushed into the lyrics, so the album plays as soft pop album—and a very, very good one at that [...] it adds up to arguably the most consistent Alan Parsons Project album—perhaps not in terms of concept, but in terms of music they never were as satisfying as they were here."

Track listing

Personnel
Chris Rainbow – main vocal (Track 4)
Lenny Zakatek – main vocal (Tracks 6 & 9)
Elmer Gantry – main vocal (Track 7)
Eric Woolfson – keyboards, main vocal (Tracks 2, 5, 12 & 14)
Colin Blunstone – main vocal (Track 10)
The English Chorale – choir vocals
Alan Parsons – keyboards, Fairlight programming, vocals
Andrew Powell – orchestral arrangement (1, 3, 5, 7, 8, 10), orchestral conductor (1, 3, 5, 7, 8, 10), piano (5)
David Paton – bass guitar, lead vocal (Track 3)
Ian Bairnson – acoustic & electric guitars
Mel Collins – saxophone
Stuart Elliott – drums, percussion

Charts

Weekly charts

Year-end charts

Certifications and sales

References

The Alan Parsons Project albums
Concept albums
1982 albums
Albums with cover art by Hipgnosis
Albums produced by Alan Parsons
Arista Records albums
Grammy Award for Best Immersive Audio Album